The Chinese Ambassador to the Solomon Islands is the official representatives of the People's Republic of China to the Solomon Islands since 2019.

List of representatives

References

See also
 List of ambassadors of the Republic of China to the Solomon Islands

Solomon Islands
 
China